Branch is a city in Franklin County, Arkansas, United States. It is part of the Fort Smith, Arkansas-Oklahoma Metropolitan Statistical Area. The population was 367 at the 2010 census.

Geography
Branch is located in southwestern Franklin County at the junctions of Arkansas Highways 22 and 41. Highway 22 leads east  to Caulksville and west  to Charleston, while Highway 41 leads north  to Cecil and south  to Booneville.

Demographics

As of the census of 2000, there were 357 people, 141 households, and 106 families residing in the city. The racial makeup of the city was 96.08% White, 1.68% Native American, 0.84% Asian, 0.56% from other races, and 0.84% from two or more races.  0.56% of the population were Hispanic or Latino of any race.

There were 141 households, out of which 31.9% had children under the age of 18 living with them, 63.8% were married couples living together, 6.4% had a female householder with no husband present, and 24.8% were non-families. 21.3% of all households were made up of individuals, and 7.8% had someone living alone who was 65 years of age or older.  The average household size was 2.53 and the average family size was 2.92.

In the city, the population was spread out, with 24.4% under the age of 18, 7.0% from 18 to 24, 29.7% from 25 to 44, 24.6% from 45 to 64, and 14.3% who were 65 years of age or older.  The median age was 37 years. For every 100 females, there were 108.8 males.  For every 100 females age 18 and over, there were 103.0 males.

The median income for a household in the city was $29,531, and the median income for a family was $33,750. Males had a median income of $21,875 versus $17,266 for females. The per capita income for the city was $15,317.  About 6.9% of families and 9.9% of the population were below the poverty line, including 16.9% of those under age 18 and none of those age 65 or over.

Notable person

Gary Stubblefield, state senator from Franklin County; dairy farmer in Branch

References

Cities in Arkansas
Cities in Franklin County, Arkansas
Fort Smith metropolitan area